David Alan Storf (born 16 May 1931) is an English former professional footballer who played in the Football League for Barrow and Rochdale.

References

1943 births
Living people
English footballers
Association football forwards
English Football League players
Sheffield Wednesday F.C. players
Rochdale A.F.C. players
Barrow A.F.C. players
Fleetwood Town F.C. players